Christopher Ryan Armstrong (born June 26, 1975) is a Canadian former  professional ice hockey defenceman who played in the National Hockey League (NHL). Armstrong was born in Regina, Saskatchewan, but grew up in Whitewood, Saskatchewan.

Playing career
Armstrong was drafted by the Florida Panthers of the National Hockey League in the 1993 NHL Entry Draft in the third round, 57th overall. He never played a game for the Panthers. The Nashville Predators claimed him in the 1998 NHL Expansion Draft and then in 1999 he was signed as a free agent by the San Jose Sharks.

The Minnesota Wild then claimed Armstrong in the 2000 NHL Expansion Draft. After spells in the IHL, and AHL, he finally made the jump to the NHL for three games in the 2000–01 season with the Wild. His tenure as a Wild did not last long, though, as the New York Islanders signed him as a free agent in 2001.

Armstrong did not play his next NHL game until after he was signed as a free agent by the Mighty Ducks of Anaheim in 2003. He played four games for the Ducks in the 2003–04 season. In seven NHL games, he has no goals, one assist, one point, and no penalty minutes.

Returning or the 2009–10 season, Armstrong eventually signed as a free agent with the Springfield Falcons of the AHL on December 5, 2009.

Career statistics

Regular season and playoffs

International

Awards
 WHL East First All-Star Team – 1994
 WHL East Second All-Star Team – 1995

References

External links
 

1975 births
Augsburger Panther players
Bridgeport Sound Tigers players
Canadian ice hockey defencemen
Carolina Monarchs players
Cincinnati Cyclones (IHL) players
Cincinnati Mighty Ducks players
Cleveland Lumberjacks players
ERC Ingolstadt players
EV Zug players
Florida Panthers draft picks
Fort Wayne Komets players
Frankfurt Lions players
Hershey Bears players
Sportspeople from Regina, Saskatchewan
Kentucky Thoroughblades players
Living people
Mighty Ducks of Anaheim players
Milwaukee Admirals (IHL) players
Minnesota Wild players
Moose Jaw Warriors players
Springfield Falcons players
Ice hockey people from Saskatchewan
People from Whitewood, Saskatchewan
Canadian expatriate ice hockey players in Germany
Canadian expatriate ice hockey players in Switzerland